Dera Baba Nanak is a town and a municipal council in Gurdaspur district, in the state of Punjab, India. It is 36km away from Gurdaspur city, the capital of the district. Since November 2019, a corridor between India and Pakistan has been established at its shrine.

Demographics
 India census, Dera Baba Nanak had a population of 7493. Males constitute 52% of the population and females 48%. Dera Baba Nanak has an average literacy rate of 75%, higher than the national average of 59.5%: male literacy is 78%, and female literacy is 72%. In Dera Baba Nanak 12% of the population is under 6 years of age.

History
Dera Baba Nanak, one of the most sacred places of the Sikhs, is situated on the banks of river Ravi. Three famous Gurudwaras at Dera Baba Nanak are Sri Darbar Sahib, Sri Chola Sahib and Tahli Sahib (Gurudwara of BaBa Sri Chand ji) eldest son of Guru Nanak, the first Sikh Guru. Guru Nanak, the first Sikh Guru settled and is believed to have "mingled with the Almighty" near the village Pakhoke Mehmaran, opposite to the present town and named it Kartarpur - a town which lies over the border in Pakistan. The Bedis (Khatris), descendants of Guru Nanak built a new town and named it Dera Baba Nanak after their ancestor. 

The town has a number of Gurdwaras. Pilgrims come to this holy town in large numbers. Dera Baba Nanak was made the headquarters of the newly created Tehsil of Dera Baba Nanak. Dera Baba Nanak is a historical town and has many lanes and houses that have been preserved since the time of Guru Nanak. Also from this town, pilgrims can see across the border into Pakistan and see the Gurdwara Darbar Sahib at Kartarpur.

Gurudwara Sri Darbar Sahib was built in commemoration of Guru Nanak. He came here after his first Udasi (tour) during December 1515 AD to see members of his family. His wife Mata Sulakkhani and his two sons Sri Chand and Lakhmi Chand had come to stay here in their maternal home at Pakho-Ke-Randhawa near Dera Baba Nanak, where Lala Mool Raj, father–in–law of Guru Nanak, was working as a Patwari.

The town forms part of the Kartarpur Corridor.

Politics
The city is part of the Dera Baba Nanak Assembly Constituency.

Gallery

See also
Dharowali

References

External links
photo and brief history
A page from history
Una Sahib- National Heritage
 Dera Baba Nanak
 DeraBabaNanak

Cities and towns in Gurdaspur district